Nqabayomzi Lawrence Saziso Kwankwa is a South African politician from the Eastern Cape. He has been serving as a Member of the National Assembly of South Africa for the United Democratic Movement (UDM) since August 2013. He is the deputy president of the UDM and the party's chief whip.

Early life and education
Kwankwa was born in the previous Cape Province, now the Eastern Cape. He grew up in poverty. His father was also a polygamist. He later moved to Cape Town in the 1990s and was homeless for a short time. Due to his financial situation, he could not attend his father's funeral and burial in Middledrift, Eastern Cape, in 1999.

Kwankwa soon found work as a cleaner and security guard. He attended university and achieved a degree in Economics. He proceeded to work in the banking sector before becoming a politician.

Political career
Kwankwa's family were supporters of the African National Congress (ANC). He was a member of the South African Student Congress (SASCO) and participated in SASCO activities, while at university. He left the ANC in 2006 and joined the UDM in 2007.

Kwankwa became a politician in 2009. In 2010, he was elected Deputy Secretary-General of the UDM. He was sworn in as a Member of Parliament in August 2013. He won a full term in May 2014 and became chief whip of the party's parliamentary caucus.

Kwankwa challenged Khanyisile Litchfield-Tshabalala for the post of UDM deputy president in December 2015 and Litchfield-Tshabalala won the election. A year later, in December 2016, Kwankwa was elected to the post following the resignation of Litchfield-Tshabalala. After the 2019 general election, Kwankwa was sworn in for another term as an MP. He remains the party's chief whip.

Personal life
Kwankwa is married and has five children. He won the 2015 Outstanding International Leadership Award. The award has since been renamed after him.

References

External links
Mr Nqabayomzi Lawrence Saziso Kwankwa – Parliament of South Africa
Mr Nqabayomzi Lawrence Saziso Kwankwa – People's Assembly
National Leadership: UDM

Living people
Xhosa people
Year of birth missing (living people)
People from the Eastern Cape
African National Congress politicians
United Democratic Movement (South Africa) politicians
Members of the National Assembly of South Africa
21st-century South African politicians